Ludiente is a village in the  Alto Mijares district of, Castellón, Valencia, Spain.

Municipalities in the Province of Castellón
Alto Mijares